Ban Phiakhamkak is a village in Phouvong District in the Attopu Province of southeast Laos.

References

Populated places in Attapeu province
Phouvong District